The 1988 Yonex All England Open Championships was the 78th edition held in 1988, at Wembley Arena, London. In the men's singles Ib Frederiksen became the first unseeded player to win an All England singles title since the seeding system was first introduced.

Final results

Men's singles

Seeds

Section 1

Section 2

Women's singles

Seeds

Section 1

Section 2

References
newspapers.nl.sg

All England Open Badminton Championships
All England Open
All England
All England Open Badminton Championships
All England Open Badminton Championships in London
All England Open Badminton Championships